Kalyani is a 1971 Indian Kannada film, created under the banner " Manjula Production " Channapatna. It was directed by Geethapriya and produced by M. V. Chandre Gowda from Channapatna. The film stars Jayanthi, Gangadhar, Ranga and Vijayakala in the lead roles. The film has musical score by Vijaya Bhaskar.

Cast
 Jayanthi
 Gangadhar
 Ranga
 Vijayakala
 K. S. Ashwath
 M. Jayashree

Soundtrack
The music was composed by Vijaya Bhaskar.

References

External links
 

1971 films
1970s Kannada-language films
Films scored by Vijaya Bhaskar
Films directed by Geethapriya